Imma diaphana is a moth in the family Immidae. It was described by Arnold Pagenstecher in 1884. It is found on the Moluccas. This species is also diurnal.

References

Moths described in 1884
Immidae
Moths of Indonesia
Taxa named by Arnold Pagenstecher